David Kilel (born 21 May 1984) is a Kenyan long-distance runner.

He won a silver medal in 3000 metres at the 2001 World Youth Championships and finished eighth in the short race at the 2003 World Cross Country Championships.

Personal bests
3000 metres - 7:42.49 min (2002)
5000 metres - 13:11.83 min (2004)

External links

1984 births
Living people
Kenyan male long-distance runners
Kenyan male middle-distance runners
Kenyan male cross country runners
20th-century Kenyan people
21st-century Kenyan people